Mangistau (Mañğystau) is a selo and the administrative center of Munaily District in Mangystau Region in western Kazakhstan. Population:

References

Populated places in Mangystau Region